= Toroflux =

Circular spring

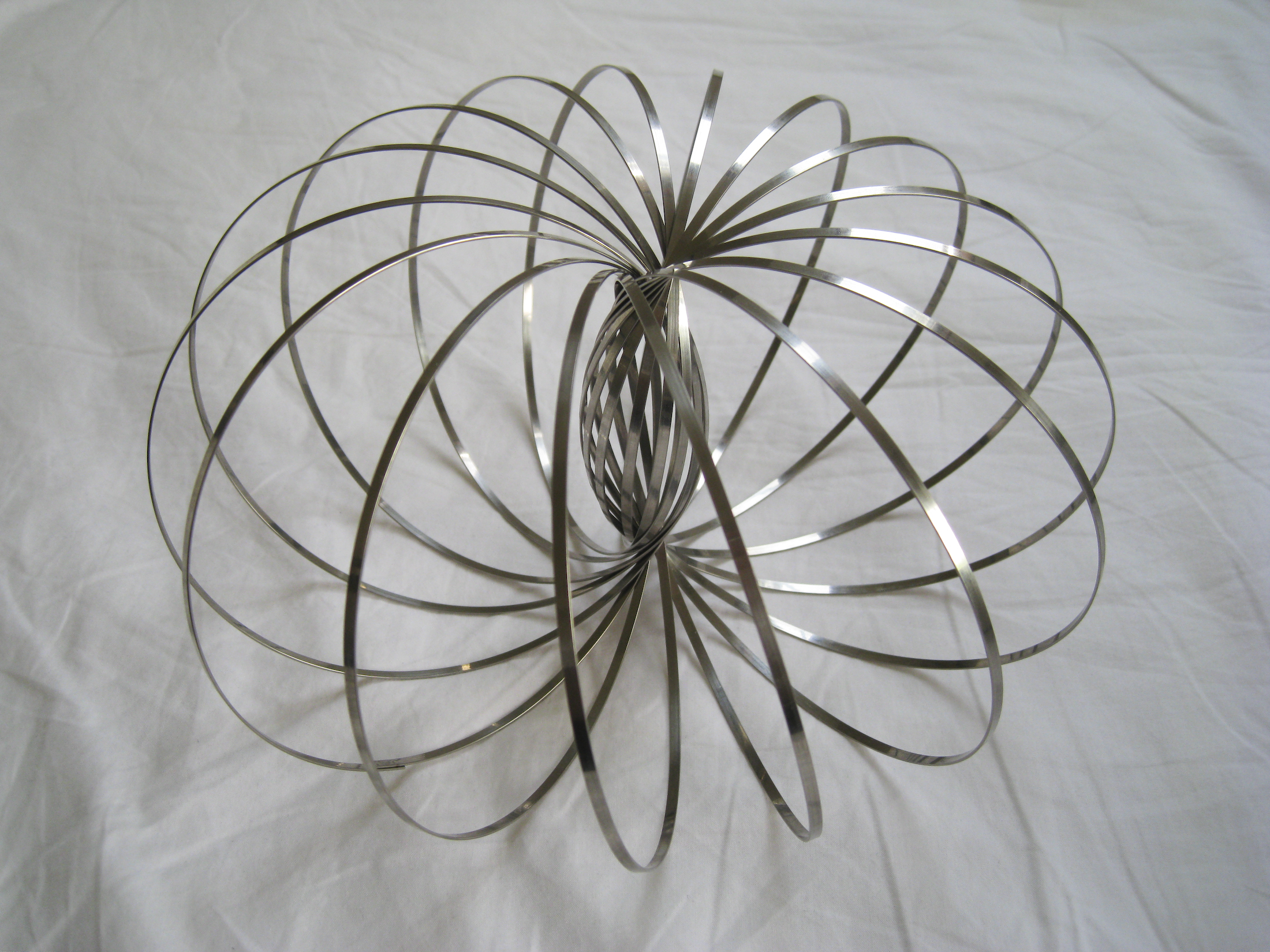
Toroflux shown without accompanying ring

The Toroflux or Torofluxus is a toy that was invented in the mid-1990s by Jochen Valett. It is a 27-foot-long (8.2 m) ribbon of steel which is woven into a torus spring. It is often sold pre-attached to a larger plastic ring. The spring flows downwards along the plastic ring, creating a shimmering effect like a silver bubble. The spring tension in the steel tightens the inner spiral core, causing it to cling to the plastic ring — just like a silver bubble.

In 2010, California-based company "Flowtoys" purchased the rights to the Toroflux and began manufacturing it as a consumer item. There are different brands who manufacture the Toroflux under a different name. It is now purchasable on multiple websites.
